The 2012 African Championships in Athletics was held at the Stade Charles de Gaulle in Porto Novo, Benin from 27 June to 1 July 2012. It was the first time that Benin had hosted the event.

Medal summary

Men

Women

Medal table

Participating nations
A total of fifty countries and 816 athletes have stated their intention to take part in the competition – a record high. There were, however, numerous non-starters with some countries like Tanzania or Eritrea not sending any athletes after all and the actual number of participants was about 569 from 47 countries, numbers comparable to last few editions.

 (13)
 (1)
 (33)
 (16)
 (9)
 (4)
 (19)
 (2)
 (1)
 (6)
 (1)
 (13)
 (3)
 (6)
 (12)
 (4)
 (56)
 (3)
 (10)
 (28)
 (1)
 (43)
 (2)
 (8)
 (15)
 (4)
 (10)
 (8)
 (16)
 (2)
 (6)
 (11)
 (43)
 (8)
 (5)
 (1)
 (16)
 (10)
 (2)
 (69)
 (4)
 (2)
 (12)
 (11)
 (11)
 (3)
 (6)

References

Daily reports
 Watta, Evelyn (2012-06-28). Lambrechts grabs first gold in rain swept Porto-Novo – African champs, Day 1. IAAF. Retrieved on 2012-06-28.
 Watta, Evelyn (2012-06-29). Milama wins first-ever sprint title for Gabon – African champs, Day 2. IAAF. Retrieved on 2012-06-29.
 Watta, Evelyn (2012-06-30). Montsho and Makwala take 400m titles in Porto-Novo – African champs, Day 3. IAAF. Retrieved on 2012-06-30.
 Watta, Evelyn (2012-07-01). Cherono takes 10,000m for second title in Porto-Novo – African champs, Day 4. IAAF. Retrieved on 2012-07-01.
 Watta, Evelyn (2012-07-02). Burundian teen Niyonsaba takes dramatic 800m title as Nigeria top medal table in Porto-Novo – African champs, Day 5. IAAF. Retrieved on 2012-07-02.

External links
 Official site
 Results 
 Confederation of African Athletics website

 
African Championships in Athletics
African Championships in Athletics
A
Athletics competitions in Benin
African Championships in Athletics
Sport in Porto-Novo
International sports competitions hosted by Benin
Athletics
Athletics